Panemeria is a genus of owlet moths in the family Noctuidae.

Species
These four species belong to the genus Panemeria:
 Panemeria lateralis
 Panemeria tenebrata (Scopoli, 1763) (small yellow underwing)  (Europe)
 Panemeria tenebromorpha Rakosy, Hentscholek & Huber, 1996
 Panemeria viehmanni

References

Natural History Museum Lepidoptera genus database
Panemeria at funet

Hadeninae